The Municipality of Mislinja is a municipality in the traditional region of Styria in northeastern Slovenia. The seat of the municipality is the town of Mislinja. Mislinja became a municipality in 1994.

Settlements
In addition to the municipal seat of Mislinja, the municipality also includes the following settlements:

 Dovže
 Gornji Dolič
 Kozjak
 Mala Mislinja
 Paka
 Razborca
 Šentilj pod Turjakom
 Srednji Dolič
 Tolsti Vrh pri Mislinji
 Završe

References

External links

Municipality of Mislinja on Geopedia
Mislinja municipal site

Mislinja
1994 establishments in Slovenia